Aegires albopunctatus, common name salt-and-pepper doris, is a species of sea slug, an Eastern Pacific Ocean nudibranch, a marine, opisthobranch gastropod mollusk in the family Aegiridae.

Distribution
This marine species occurs off British Columbia, Canada to Baja California, Mexico.

References

Aegiridae
Gastropods described in 1905